Parametrization, also spelled 
parameterization,
parametrisation or 
parameterisation,
is the process of defining or choosing parameters. 

Parametrization may refer more specifically to:
 Parametrization (geometry), the process of finding parametric equations of a curve, surface, etc.
 Parametrization by arc length, a natural parametrization of a curve
 Parameterization theorem or smn theorem, a result in computability theory
 Parametrization (atmospheric modeling), a method of approximating complex processes

See also
 Parameter (disambiguation)